Pisania ignea is a species of sea snail, a marine gastropod mollusk in the family Pisaniidae.

Description

Distribution

References

 Dautzenberg, Ph. (1929). Contribution à l'étude de la faune de Madagascar: Mollusca marina testacea. Faune des colonies françaises, III(fasc. 4). Société d'Editions géographiques, maritimes et coloniales: Paris. 321–636, plates IV-VII
 Liu J.Y. [Ruiyu] (ed.). (2008). Checklist of marine biota of China seas. China Science Press. 1267 pp.
 Kilburn R.N., Marais J.P. & Fraussen K. (2010) Buccinidae. pp. 16–52, in: Marais A.P. & Seccombe A.D. (eds), Identification guide to the seashells of South Africa. Volume 1. Groenkloof: Centre for Molluscan Studies. 376 pp.

External links

Pisaniidae
Gastropods described in 1790
Taxa named by Johann Friedrich Gmelin